Garuda Indonesia Flight 035 was a domestic Garuda Indonesia flight that struck a pylon and crashed on approach to Medan-Polonia Airport on 4 April 1987. 23 of the 45 passengers and crew on board were killed in the accident.

Accident
The aircraft was on an Instrument Landing System approach to Medan Airport in a thunderstorm. The aircraft struck electrical power lines and crashed short of the runway. The aircraft broke up and the tail section separated and fire broke out.

Most of the survivors escaped through breaks in the fuselage and 11 were flung free of the aircraft. Four of the eight crew died and 19 passengers suffered fatal injuries due to smoke inhalation and burns. Four crew and 18 passengers suffered serious injuries. All of the fatalities were a result of  the fire and not due to the impact with the ground.

Aircraft
The flight was carried out by a 1976-built Douglas DC-9-32 registered PK-GNQ. The aircraft was damaged beyond repair. This registration was later given to a Boeing 737-800, also operated by the same airline.

References

1987 in Indonesia
Accidents and incidents involving the McDonnell Douglas DC-9
Airliner accidents and incidents caused by weather
Aviation accidents and incidents in 1987
Aviation accidents and incidents in Indonesia
Flight 035
April 1987 events in Asia
1987 disasters in Indonesia